Highway 2 is an Iraqi highway which extends from Baghdad to Silopi in Turkey.  It passes through Baqubah, Al Khalis, Kirkuk, Irbil, Mosul, Dohuk and Zakhu.

Roads in Iraq